Esperance Luvindao is a health advocate, medical doctor, public speaking coach, Forbes 30 Under 30 2022 in Namibia. In February 2022, she won the Commonwealth Points of Light Award for offering 44,000 free online consultations, to people during the coronavirus pandemic.

Background and education
Luvindao was born in Namibia , to parents who originated from the Democratic Republic of the Congo. She graduated from the  University of Namibia School of Medicine, with a Bachelor of Medicine and Bachelor of Surgery (MBChB) degree. She went on to obtain a Master of Business Administration (MBA) degree from the Management College of Southern Africa (MANCOSA), in Durban, South Africa. She also has qualifications in Executive and Management Coaching from the University of Cape Town, South Africa,and currently studied towards her postgraduate in public health with the University of Pretoria.

Work experience 
Luvindao served as data manager for the Namibian Covid-19 National Task Force before going into full time clinical practice. She is currently employed as a medical practitioner in Namibia under the Ministry of Health and Social Services and specialises in managing gynaecological patients, as well as patients with non-communicable diseases. Luvindao serves on the Health Professionals Council of Namibia Disciplinary Board. 
Her main work offices are in Windhoek, the country's capital city, where she also lives. As part of her community service, Luvindao worked in northern Namibia where she observed first hand the long distances that patients travel to access medical care. She is a vocal advocate for equitable medical care for poor and marginalised communities.

Luvindao is CEO of Speaker's Globe, a public speaking university. As of July 2021, the academy had about 200 students including doctors, accountants, lawyers and medical students from Namibia, South Africa, Zimbabwe, the United States and other countries.

Other considerations
Luvindao started "1 Step at A Time", a charitable organisation that helped purchase medical equipment destined for village health practices in remote locations. The equipment helps the delivery of healthcare to "thousands of patients", in hard-to-reach places. Inn cooperation with the Office of the First Lady of Namibia, Luvindao also launched the "Peace to Woman Project" after winning the Miss Grand Namibia pageant in 2016 when she was a fourth-year medical student at the School of Medicine at the University of Namibia, aiming to address the issue of keeping young girls in school.

References

External links
 Personal Profile at https://www.esperanceluvindao.com

1994 births
Living people
Namibian women physicians
University of Namibia alumni
University of Rochester alumni
Management College of Southern Africa alumni
Namibian beauty pageant winners